The New York Public Interest Research Group (NYPIRG) is a New York statewide student-directed, non-partisan, not for profit political organization. It has existed since 1973. Its current executive director is Blair Horner and its founding director was Donald K. Ross.

NYPIRG is directed by a student-run and student-elected Board of Directors. Any issue that NYPIRG works on, or stance it takes, must be approved by its student board of directors. Smitha Varghese, student of Queens College, is the current chairperson of NYPIRG's Board of Directors. NYPIRG is one of the largest of the Public Interest Research Groups, which were inspired by Ralph Nader in the 1970s, and operate at the state level.  After leaving Columbia University, former President of the United States Barack Obama worked at NYPIRG at its City College Chapter.

NYPIRG works on a variety of socioeconomic issues such as college affordability, consumer protection, sustainable energy, government accountability, hunger & homelessness, public transportation in New York City, and voter rights.

Infrastructure
NYPIRG has an office in lower Manhattan, New York City, and a legislative office located in Albany.  NYPIRG also operates in dozens of campus and regional offices statewide.

Campus program
The focus of NYPIRG's program is the campus chapters.  Campus chapters exist at schools in the State University of New York (SUNY) City University of New York (CUNY), and two private colleges (Pratt Institute and Syracuse University).  The chapters are funded by activity fees which are voted on by students, and/or determined by student governments.

Chapter locations

 Binghamton University
 Borough of Manhattan Community College
 Bronx Community College
 Brooklyn College
 Buffalo State College
 City College of New York
 SUNY Cortland
 Hunter College
 Nassau Community College
 SUNY New Paltz
 New York City College of Technology
 Pratt Institute
 SUNY Purchase
 Queens College
 Queensborough Community College
 College of Staten Island
 Syracuse University - SUNY College of Environmental Science and Forestry

References

External links

Public Interest Research Groups
Government watchdog groups in the United States
Political advocacy groups in the United States
Organizations established in 1973
Non-profit organizations based in New York City
New York Public Interest Research Group
1973 establishments in New York (state)